Wardtown is an unincorporated community in Northampton County, Virginia, United States.

Grapeland was listed on the National Register of Historic Places in 1980.

References

GNIS reference

Unincorporated communities in Virginia
Unincorporated communities in Northampton County, Virginia